In molecular biology, SNORA21 (also known as ACA21) is a member of the H/ACA class of small nucleolar RNA that guide the sites of modification of uridines to pseudouridines.

This family also contains the mouse sequence MBI-3.

References

External links 
 

Small nuclear RNA